Siddharth Batra is a computer scientist, researcher, and entrepreneur who has authored several papers in the area of artificial intelligence. Batra is currently the co-founder  of X1 Card a no annual fee credit card that has been dubbed “the smartest credit card ever made.”

Biography
Batra obtained his B.S. from Jaypee Institute of Information Technology and M.S. in computer science from Stanford University under the supervision of Andrew Ng. At Stanford, Batra worked on the STAIR (Stanford Artificial Intelligence Robot)  where he wrote a thesis on High-accuracy 3d sensing for mobile manipulation as well as a paper on energy disaggregation. Batra, together with Ashutosh Saxena and Andrew Ng, invented a patented system for augmenting video content  and used it to create a video advertising company ZunaVision which was funded by Stanford professor David Cheriton.

In 2013, Batra joined Twitter and went on to become a Director of Engineering in the Ads team. In 2017, Batra co-founded Thrive Financial Inc. which was later renamed to X1 Inc. after the launch of their credit card product.

References

American computer scientists
Artificial intelligence researchers
Living people
Machine learning researchers
People from San Francisco
Stanford University alumni
Year of birth missing (living people)